Kossak is the surname of 4 generations of notable Polish painters, writers and poets, descending from the historical painter Juliusz Kossak. Notable people with this surname include:
 Progenitor, Juliusz Kossak (1824–99), Polish painter from the partitions period
 Tadeusz Kossak (1857–1935), Polish army officer and freedom fighter
 Wojciech Kossak (1857–1942), painter, son of Juliusz Kossak
 Jerzy Kossak (1886–1955), painter, son of Wojciech Kossak, grandson of Juliusz Kossak
 Zofia Kossak-Szczucka (1889–1968), novelist, daughter of Wojciech Kossak's twin brother Tadeusz Kossak, granddaughter of Juliusz Kossak
 Maria Pawlikowska-Jasnorzewska née Kossak (1891–1945), poet, second daughter of Wojciech Kossak, granddaughter of Juliusz Kossak
 Magdalena Samozwaniec née Kossak (1894–1972), writer, third daughter of Wojciech Kossak, granddaughter of Juliusz Kossak
  (1896–1975), painter and illustrator 
 Zenon Kossak (1907–1939), Ukrainian activist
 Gloria Kossak (1941–1991), painter and poet, daughter of Wojciech Kossak's son, Jerzy Kossak (1886–1955)

See also
 Kozak (surname)
 Cossack (disambiguation)

Surnames of Polish origin